The 2013–14 TFF First League, also known as PTT First League) due to sponsoring reasons (in Turkish: PTT 1. Lig, is the 13th season since the league was established in 2001 and 51st season of the second-level football league of Turkey since its establishment in 1963–64.

Teams
Orduspor, Mersin İdman Yurdu and İstanbul B.B. relegated from Süper Lig. Kayseri Erciyesspor, Çaykur Rizespor and Konyaspor promoted to 2013–14 Süper Lig.

Kahramanmaraşspor, Balıkesirspor and Fethiyespor promoted from TFF Second League. Göztepe, Kartalspor and Ankaragücü relegated to 2013–14 TFF Second League.

League table

Results

Promotion Playoffs

Semifinals

First legs

Second legs

Final

Statistics

Top goalscorers

See also
 2013–14 Turkish Cup
 2013–14 Süper Lig
 2013–14 TFF Second League
 2013–14 TFF Third League

References

TFF First League seasons
Turkey
2